Knoxville is a city in the U.S. state of Tennessee.

Knoxville may also refer to:

Places 
 Knoxville, Alabama
 Knoxville, Arkansas
 Knoxville, California
 Knoxville, Georgia, the county seat of Crawford County
 Knoxville, Illinois
 Knoxville, Iowa
 Knoxville, Missouri
 Knoxville, Maryland
 Knoxville, Nebraska
 Knoxville, Ohio
 Knoxville, Pennsylvania
 Knoxville (Pittsburgh), Pennsylvania
 Knoxville, West Virginia
 Knoxville metropolitan area, Tennessee

Other uses 
 Knoxville (video game), a cancelled video game by Press Play
 Knoxville College, a small, historically black college
 Johnny Knoxville (born 1971), American comic actor and stunt performer
 Knoxville Raceway, a United States Automobile Club Dirt Track
 Knoxville: Summer of 1915, a rhapsody for voice and orchestra composed by Samuel Barber